Sphaerospora may refer to:
 Sphaerospora (cnidarian), a genus of cnidarians in the family Sphaerosporidae
 Sphaerospora, a genus of fungi in the family Pyronemataceae, synonym of Scutellinia
 Sphaerospora Klatt, 1864, a genus of plants in the family Iridaceae, synonym of Geissorhiza
 Sphaerospora Sweet, a genus of plants in the family Iridaceae, synonym of Gladiolus

See also 
 Sphaerospira, a gastropod genus